The Bullough–Dodd model is an integrable model in 1+1-dimensional quantum field theory introduced by Robin Bullough and Roger Dodd. Its
Lagrangian density is

The Bullough–Dodd model belongs to the class of affine Toda field theories.

The spectrum of the model consists of a single massive particle.

See also

List of integrable models

References

Quantum field theory
Exactly solvable models
Integrable systems